Birchills railway station served the village of Birchills, West Midlands, England, from 1858 to 1916 on the Chase Line.

History 
The station first appeared in Bradshaw in February 1858, but on Saturday market days only. It opened fully on 1 June 1858. It was known as Birchills Halt in some 1909 timetables. It closed on 1 January 1916. Nothing remains.

References

External links 

Railway stations in Great Britain opened in 1858
Railway stations in Great Britain closed in 1916
1858 establishments in England
1916 disestablishments in England